Tropidia pulchra is a species of hoverfly in the family Syrphidae.

Distribution
Argentina.

References

Eristalinae
Diptera of South America
Taxa named by Frank Montgomery Hull
Insects described in 1944